Vasanthathinte Kanal Vazhikalil is a 2014 Malayalam-language political drama film directed by Anil V Nagendran, who is also the producer, writer and lyricist. The film stars Samuthirakani and Tamil actress Thamarai in the lead roles with an ensemble supporting cast of Mukesh, Sudheesh, Surabhi, Rithesh, and Baiju VK.

Plot 
The film revolves around the political unrest in a village and the rise of three communist leaders from the pre-Independence era in KeralaP. Krishna Pillai, E. M. S. Namboodiripad, and A. K. Gopalan.

Cast 

Samuthirakani as P. Krishna Pillai
Baiju VK as A. K. Gopalan
Sudheesh as E. M. S. Namboodiripad
Thamarai
Mukesh as a journalist
Siddique
Surabhi  as Chirutha
Rithesh as Rairu Nambiar
K. P. A. C. Lalitha  as Madhaviyamma 
 P. K. Medini
Devan
 Bharani
Bheeman Raghu 
Unnikrishnan Namboothiri
Prem Kumar
 Shari as Theyi
 Gopika Anil as Mathangi
 Urmila Unni as Antharjanam
Dharmajan Bolgatty
 Devika Nambiar

Production 
After making audio biographies about left-wing politics about E. M. S. Namboodiripad, A. K. Gopalan and P. Krishna Pillai, Nagendran went on to work on a feature film about these politicians with Sudheesh, Baiju, and Samuthirakani reprising the roles of Namboodiripad, Gopalan, and Pillai, respectively. A 6 kilometer set was erected in sooranad,Kollam and all signals of the modern day including light posts and electrical lines were removed. Three-thousand actors have acted in the film, many of which are labourers who were trained to act. Cinematographer Kaviyarasu debuts in Mollywood with this film. Real footage from the Indian independence movement was included in the film.

Soundtrack 
Eight composers have composed the film songs and twenty singers have sung the songs. This film is the last film that V. Dakshinamoorthy composed music for. Activist P. K. Medini composed and sang a song in addition to acting in the film. Anchal Udayakumar composed the background score for the film.

Release 
The film originally released in March. The film received a complaint from the election commission that the film supported left-wing politics. The film was re-released in April.

Awards and nominations

References 

2010s political drama films
2014 films
2010s Malayalam-language films
Indian political drama films
Films shot in Kannur
Films shot in Kozhikode
Films shot in Kollam
Films scored by V. Dakshinamoorthy
Films scored by A. R. Reihana
2014 drama films